Coldwave Breaks II is a various artists compilation album released on October 28, 1997 by 21st Circuitry.

Reception

Aiding & Abetting compared Coldwave Breaks II favorably to the first compilation, saying "this one carries forth the same attitude from the first, and works to find new and innovative electronic-oriented bands." Steve Huey of allmusic awarded the compilation three out of five possible stars. Critic Richard T. Thurston of Ink 19 warmly reviewed the album and described it as "venture into the dark side of industrial techhouse." Sonic Boom called the album one of the "more concise Sythcore collections of the year" and credited Acumen, Beauty, LUXT and Rammstein as being standouts.

Track listing 

Notes
 Tracks 15–22 consist of four seconds of silence each

Accolades

Personnel
Adapted from the Coldwave Breaks II liner notes.

 tara ntula – cover art, design
 Guy Slater – mastering

Release history

References

External links 
 Coldwave Breaks II at Discogs (list of releases)

1997 compilation albums
Electronic body music compilation albums
Industrial rock compilation albums
21st Circuitry compilation albums